Trois-Palis (literally Three Palisades) is a commune in the Charente department of southwestern France.

Population

See also
Communes of the Charente department

References

Communes of Charente